Sabir Zafar is a leading poet and lyricist in Pakistan. He has written songs for many Pakistani films, singers such as Nazia Hasan, Sajjad Ali, Ali Azmat and his band Junoon, as well as many successful TV drama serials.  He was awarded a Tamgha-e-Imtiaz (Medal of Distinction) by the Government of Pakistan in 2010.

Early life and career
Sabir Zafar belongs to Pasrur and 
was born as Muzaffar Ahmed in Kahuta, Rawalpindi District on 12 September 1949 to a school teacher.

Sabir Zafar worked with the Press Information Department of the Government of Sindh. He started writing poetry in 1968. He thinks that he should stay in touch with reality and his poetry should also be based on real-life issues and problems of daily life.

Sabir Zafar believes Sufism mellows a person and makes him tolerant of other peoples' views.

Songs

Junoon (band)
 "Azadi"
 "Baarish"
 "Chaen"
 "Chalay Thay Saath"
 "Chal Kuriye"
 "Dewaar"
 "Dharti Keh Khuda"
 "Dil Nahin Lag Raha" 
 "Dosti"
 "Garaj Baras"
 "Ghoom Taana"
 "Heeray"
 "Hungama"
 "Husan Walo"
 "Ishq", 
 "Janey Tu"
 "Jhulle Lal"
 "Kaisay Gaaon Main"
 "Kisne Suna"
 "Kyun Parishan"
 "Lal Meri Pat"
 "Loishay"
 "Mahiwal"
 "Maza Zindagi Ka"
 "Meri Awaaz Suno"
 "Mitti"
 "Mukh Gae" 
 "Pappu Yaar"
 "Pyar Bina"
 "Rondé Naina"
 "Saeein Alaap"
 "Sanwal"
 "Sapnay"
 "Sayonee"
 "Shamein"
 "Sheena"
 "Sheeshay Kay Ghar"
 "Taara Jala"
 "Wahda Hoo"
 "Zamane Ke Andaz" (partially)

Albums
 "Hotline" by Nazia and Zoheb Hassan
 "Love Letter" by Sajjad Ali

Television
Zafar has penned the lyrics to the following title songs:

 Man-o-Salwa (2007) broadcast by Hum TV. Sung by Zila Khan
 Wafa Kaisi Kahan Ka Ishq (2009) broadcast by Hum TV. Sung by Zain Ali Khan
 Meri Zaat Zarra-e-Benishan (2010) broadcast by Geo TV. Sung by Rahat Fateh Ali Khan
 Choti Si Kahani (2011) broadcast by Pakistan Television Corporation. Sung by Sara Raza Khan
 Maat (2011) broadcast Hum TV. Sung by Muhammad Ali.
 Kuch Pyar Ka Pagalpan (2011-12) broadcast ARY Digital. Sung by Rahat Fateh Ali Khan.
 Daray Daray Naina (2012) broadcast by A-Plus. Sung by Shreya Ghoshal
 Diyar-e-Dil (2015) broadcast by Hum TV. Sung by Zebunnisa Bangash
 Ek Thi Marium (2016) broadcast by Urdu 1. Sung by Zebunnisa Bangash
Aatish (2018) broadcast by Hum TV. Sung by  Ali Tariq & Bushra
Balaa (2018) broadcast by ARY Digital. Sung by Faiza Mujahid & Zohaib Hassan
Cheekh (2019) broadcast by ARY Digital. Sung by Asrar
Hassad (2019) broadcast by ARY Digital. Sung by Sehar Gul Khan
Raaz-e-Ulfat (2020) broadcast by GEO TV. Sung by Aima Baig & Shani Arshad
Hum Kahan Ke Sachay Thay (2021) broadcast by 
Hum TV. Sung by Yashal Shahid

Bollywood Films
 "Garaj Baras" in Paap (2003). Sung by Ali Azmat

Other songs
 Hai Jazba Junoon Tau Himmat Na Haar written for the 1996 Cricket World Cup - Sung by Junoon

Books
Lahu Tarang (a collection of folktales of all the four provinces of Pakistan in Urdu language)

Awards and recognition
Tamgha-e-Imtiaz (Medal of Excellence) in 2010 by the President of Pakistan
PTV Award (Pakistan Television Corporation Award) in 2002 for Best Lyricist
 MTV (Pakistani TV channel) Music Award in 2009 for Best Lyricist

References

External links
 

1949 births
Living people
Pakistani poets
Urdu-language poets from Pakistan
Pakistani lyricists
Pakistani songwriters
Recipients of Tamgha-e-Imtiaz
PTV Award winners